Victoria in Dover (German title: Mädchenjahre einer Königin) is a 1936 German romantic comedy film directed by Erich Engel and starring Jenny Jugo, Olga Limburg and Renée Stobrawa. It is based on a play by Geza Silberer. The film was remade in 1954 with Romy Schneider.

Synopsis
After her Prime Minister Lord Melbourne arranges a marriage for her with the German Prince Albert, the young Queen Victoria decides to leave London and spend some time in Kent. While there she meets a handsome young German and falls in love, unaware that he is her intended husband Albert.

Cast

References

Bibliography 
 Fritsche, Maria. Homemade Men in Postwar Austrian Cinema: Nationhood, Genre and Masculinity. Berghahn Books, 2013.

External links
 

1936 films
German romantic comedy films
German historical comedy films
1930s historical comedy films
1936 romantic comedy films
Cultural depictions of Queen Victoria on film
Films set in London
Films set in Kent
Films set in the 1830s
1930s German-language films
Films directed by Erich Engel
Films of Nazi Germany
German black-and-white films
German historical romance films
1930s German films